Streptanthus bernardinus is a species of flowering plant in the mustard family known by the common name Laguna Mountains jewelflower, or Laguna Mountain jewelflower.

Distribution
It is native to southern California and northern Baja California, where it grows in the Transverse Ranges around Los Angeles and the Peninsular Ranges to the south, including the Laguna Mountains east of San Diego and the Sierra de Juarez and Sierra de San Pedro Mártir of Baja. Its habitat includes temperate coniferous forest and chaparral on mountain slopes.

Description
Streptanthus bernardinus is a perennial herb growing from a woody caudex and producing an erect stem up to 60 to 80 centimeters tall. It is hairless and sometimes waxy in texture. The basal leaves are widely lance-shaped and up to 8 centimeters long by 2.5 wide. They are borne on petioles. Narrower lance-shaped leaves occur higher on the stem and may clasp the stem at their bases.

Flowers occur at intervals along the upper stem. Each has a bell-shaped calyx of greenish to yellow or white sepals just under a centimeter long. White petals emerge from the tip. The fruit is a thin, narrow silique which may be 8 to 12 centimeters in length or longer.

References

External links
Jepson Manual Treatment - Streptanthus bernardinus
Streptanthus bernardinus — U.C. Photo gallery

bernardinus
Flora of Baja California
Flora of California
Natural history of the California chaparral and woodlands
Natural history of the Peninsular Ranges
Natural history of the Transverse Ranges
~
~
Flora without expected TNC conservation status